The 1992–93 season of the NOFV-Oberliga was the second season of the league at tier three (III) of the German football league system after German reunification.

The NOFV-Oberliga was split into three divisions, NOFV-Oberliga Nord, NOFV-Oberliga Mitte and NOFV-Oberliga Süd. The champions of the Nord and Mitte divisions entered into a play-off with the runners-up from Süd, which 1. FC Union Berlin won, but as they were refused a license for the 2. Bundesliga, Tennis Borussia Berlin took their place and were promoted for the 1993–94 season.

North

Central

South

2. Bundesliga play-off

External links 
 NOFV-Online – official website of the North-East German Football Association 

NOFV-Oberliga seasons
3
Germ